Daniel John McGarvey (December 2, 1887 - August 18, 1945) was an American Major League Baseball left fielder who played in one game for the Detroit Tigers on May 18, . McGarvey was one of several replacement players that the Tigers played that day after the regular Tigers players went on strike to protest the suspension of star center fielder Ty Cobb.

External links

Detroit Tigers players
Major League Baseball left fielders
1887 births
1945 deaths